Gonzalo Mathías Mastriani Borges (born 28 April 1993) is a Uruguayan professional footballer who plays as a forward for Brazilian club América Mineiro.

International career
Mastriane was capped by the Uruguay national under-20 football team in 2012, scoring three goals in five matches.

External links

PrvaLiga profile 

1993 births
Living people
Uruguayan people of Italian descent
Uruguayan footballers
Association football forwards
Uruguay under-20 international footballers
Uruguayan Primera División players
C.A. Cerro players
Serie A players
Slovenian PrvaLiga players
Parma Calcio 1913 players
Serie B players
Ecuadorian Serie A players
Liga Portugal 2 players
Campeonato Brasileiro Série A players
F.C. Crotone players
ND Gorica players
S.C. Olhanense players
C.A. Rentistas players
Sud América players
Boston River players
Guayaquil City F.C. footballers
Barcelona S.C. footballers
América Futebol Clube (MG) players
Uruguayan expatriate footballers
Uruguayan expatriate sportspeople in Italy
Uruguayan expatriate sportspeople in Portugal
Uruguayan expatriate sportspeople in Mexico
Uruguayan expatriate sportspeople in Slovenia
Uruguayan expatriate sportspeople in Ecuador
Uruguayan expatriate sportspeople in Brazil
Expatriate footballers in Italy
Expatriate footballers in Portugal
Expatriate footballers in Mexico
Expatriate footballers in Slovenia
Expatriate footballers in Ecuador
Expatriate footballers in Brazil